trans-Bis(dinitrogen)bis[1,2-bis(diphenylphosphino)ethane]molybdenum(0) is a coordination complex with the formula Mo(N2)2(dppe)2.  It is a relatively air stable yellow-orange solid.  It is notable as being the first discovered dinitrogen containing complex of molybdenum.

Structure
Mo(N2)2(dppe)2 is an octahedral complex with idealized D2h point group symmetry.  The dinitrogen ligands are mutually trans across the metal center.  The Mo-N bond has a length of 2.01 Å, and the N-N bond has a length of 1.10 Å.  This length is close to the free nitrogen bond length, but coordination to the metal weakens the N-N bond making it susceptible to electrophilic attack.

Synthesis
The first synthetic route to Mo(N2)2(DPPE)2  involved a reduction of molybdenum(III) acetylacetonate with triethylaluminum in the presence of dppe and nitrogen.

A higher yielding synthesis involves a four-step process. In the first step, molybdenum(V) chloride is reduced by acetonitrile (CH3CN) to give [MoCl4(CH3CN)2]. Acetonitrile is displaced by tetrahydrofuran (THF) to give [MoCl4(THF)2]. This Mo(IV) compound is reduced by tin powder to [MoCl3(thf)3]. The desired compound is formed in the presence of nitrogen gas, dppe ligand, and magnesium turnings as the reductant:

 3 Mg  +  2 MoCl3(THF)3  +  4 Ph2PCH2CH2PPh2  +  4 N2  →  2 trans-[Mo(N2)2(Ph2PCH2CH2PPh2)2]  +  3 MgCl2 + 6 THF

Reactivity
The terminal nitrogen is susceptible to electrophilic attack, allowing for the fixation of nitrogen to ammonia in the presence of acid.  In this way, Mo(N2)2(dppe)2 serves as a model for biological nitrogen fixation.  Carbon-nitrogen bonds can also be formed with this complex through condensation reactions with ketones and aldehydes, and substitution reactions with acid chlorides.  The terminal nitrogen can also be silylated.

See also
Transition metal dinitrogen complex
Nitrogen fixation

References

Coordination complexes
Molybdenum(0) compounds
Phosphine complexes
Nitrogen compounds